Untamed Women is a 1952 independently made American science fiction film, directed by W. Merle Connell, written by George Wallace Sayre, and starring Mikel Conrad and Doris Merrick. It was distributed by United Artists.

Plot
An American bomber pilot in World War II, Steve Holloway, is rescued by a U.S. Navy flying boat after drifting at sea in a liferaft. When he awakens from a coma at a military hospital, he tells his doctors how his copilot died when he and three of his crew members, Benny, Andy, and Ed, crashed following a bombing mission. The survivors use a liferaft to finally reach an unknown island after being adrift for eight days.

The island is inhabited by prehistoric dinosaurs and reptiles and a tribe of Amazons, who are cavewomen descended from Druids. The Amazons are being plagued by Neanderthal men intent on kidnapping and mating with them. The Neanderthals had previously killed all of the Amazon’s men, and they fear the aircrew to be in league with "the hairy men".

Steve tries to explain the aircrew’s predicament, but hearing that they were fighting a war further convinces the Amazon's leader, Sandra, of the aircrew's ill intent. However, Sandra, later frees the men from their cave cell without telling her followers.

The men follow Sandra's recommended escape route but encounter giant bison, prehistoric creatures, and flesh eating plants. Realizing their chances for survival are slim, they return to the Amazons. During their journey back, they are attacked by a giant armadillo (a Glyptodont), but the Amazons come to their aid just in time.  Myra, Valdra, Tennus, and Cleo reveal that the aircrew’s release was not a friendly act but Sandra's attempt for the indigenous animals and plants to dispose of the four men.

The Neanderthals attack, killing Ed, and the remainder of the aircrew use their pistols to kill them or drive them away. Steve recommends Benny and Andy leave the island in the liferaft. He takes the Amazons to their mountain temple from which they can better defend themselves. Benny and Andy refuse to leave Steve, knowing that the Neanderthals are preparing for another attack, while little of their ammunition remains. The mountain is actually a volcano which suddenly and violently erupts, killing Benny, Andy, and the Amazons. Steve barely makes it back to the liferaft before escaping as the eruption consumes the island.

Despite giving Holloway a serum to restore his speech, the doctors at the hospital find  his adventure incredulous. When they closely examine the medallion that Sandra gave Holloway, its design proves its Druidic origin, verifying his story.

Cast
 Mikel Conrad as Steve Holloway
 Doris Merrick as Sandra
 Richard Monahan as Benny
 Mark Lowell as Ed
 Morgan Jones as Andy
 Midge Ware as Myra
 Judy Brubaker as Valdra
 Carol Brewster as Tennus
 Autumn Russell as Cleo (as Autumn Rice)
 Lyle Talbot as Col. Loring
 Montgomery Pittman as Prof. Warren
 Miriam Kaylor as Nurse Edmunds

Production
Filmed in just a week, the film's creature special effects were lifted from the earlier Hal Roach Studios film, One Million BC (1940). The volcanic eruption sequence was reused special effects stock footage.

Reception
In 1986 the film was featured in an episode of the Canned Film Festival. TV Guide found its quality reflected its minuscule budget and short production time. The Encyclopedia of Science Fiction found the film to be mediocre.

References

Bibliography
 Warren, Bill. Keep Watching The Skies: American Science Fiction Movies of the 1950s, Vol I: 1950–1957. Jefferson, North Carolina: McFarland & Company, 1982. .

1950s science fiction adventure films
American science fiction adventure films
Films set in Oceania
Lost world films
United Artists films
American black-and-white films
Films about cavemen
Films about dinosaurs
1950s English-language films
1950s American films